Welp may refer to:
 Welp (film), a 2014 Belgian horror movie by Jonas Govaerts
 WELP, a religious radio station located in Easley, South Carolina

People with the surname
 Chris Welp (1964–2015), German professional basketball player